TV Africa is the first private fully owned Ghanaian free to air television station that has been consistent and has a credible brand for over 20 years. The station has been positioned to be the voice of Africa and the go-to station for authentic Africa news with a strong production of In-House TV programming and the best In-House TV studios (5 large and infrastructure fit studios).

References

Television stations in Ghana
Mass media in Accra